Thomas Robson (1907 – 10 April 1942) was an English professional footballer who played in the Football League for Northampton Town, Everton and Sheffield Wednesday as a wing half. He was described as "a grand type of sportsman and so far as football went, had to depend solely on his skill and ability, for he had neither height nor weight to help him out".

Personal life 
As of the outbreak of the Second World War, Robson lived close to Goodison Park with his wife and two children. He served as an ARP warden during the early phase of the war, before enlisting as a leading aircraftman in the Royal Air Force Volunteer Reserve. Robson died of a heart condition on 10 April 1942 and was buried in Kirkdale Cemetery.

Career statistics

References

English footballers
English Football League players
Everton F.C. players

1907 births
1942 deaths
People from Morpeth, Northumberland
Footballers from Northumberland
Association football wing halves
Blyth Spartans A.F.C. players
Yeovil Town F.C. players
Military personnel from Northumberland
Southern Football League players
Northampton Town F.C. players
Kettering Town F.C. players
Royal Air Force Volunteer Reserve personnel of World War II
Royal Air Force personnel killed in World War II
Royal Air Force airmen
Civil Defence Service personnel